Max Mandusic (born 12 June 1998) is an Italian pole vaulter who won four national championships, two outdoors (2019 and 2020) and two indoors (2020 and 2021).

Biography
His personal best is 5.55 m indoors in 2021 and 5.61 m outdoors (2022). His club is the Trieste Atletica and his trainer is Emanuel Margesin.

National titles
Mandusic won 5 national championships at individual senior level.

 Italian Athletics Championships
 Pole vault: 2019, 2020, 2022 (3)
 Italian Athletics Indoor Championships
 Pole vault indoor: 2020, 2021

References

External links
 

1998 births
Living people
Sportspeople from Trieste
Italian male pole vaulters
Italian Athletics Championships winners
20th-century Italian people
21st-century Italian people